Homeobox protein TGIF2 is a protein that in humans is encoded by the TGIF2 gene.

The protein encoded by this gene is a DNA-binding homeobox protein and a transcriptional repressor. The encoded protein appears to repress transcription by recruiting histone deacetylases to TGF beta-responsive genes. This gene is amplified and overexpressed in some ovarian cancers, and mutations in this gene can cause holoprosencephaly.

References

Further reading